The 1990–91 Tunisian National Championship season was the 65th season of top-tier football in Tunisia.

Results

League table

Result table

References
1990–91 Ligue 1 on RSSSF.com

Tunisian Ligue Professionnelle 1 seasons
Tun